Duncan Nderitu Ndegwa (born 11 March 1925) was the first post-independence Head of Civil Service and Secretary to the Cabinet in Kenya. He was also the first African and longest serving Governor of the Central Bank of Kenya.

Early life 
Ndegwa was born on 11 March 1925 in Nyeri County. He attended Alliance High School in Kikuyu, Makerere University College in Uganda and University of St. Andrews, Scotland.

Work
Ndegwa joined the public service in 1956 as an Economist/Statistician and was appointed Permanent Secretary, Secretary to the Cabinet and Head of the Public Service in 1963 where he served until he was appointed Governor of the Central Bank of Kenya in 1967. As the first head of the civil service, Ndegwa was at the heart of the Africanisation programme whose aim was to build an African capitalist class in industry and commerce. The two sectors had been dominated by Europeans and Asians before Kenya's independence. Ndegwa served as Governor of the Central Bank until 1982.

In December 1972, Jeremy Morse who had been elected first chairman of the Committee of 20 charged with drafting the technical structure for the forthcoming IMF reforms, asked Ndegwa and three other international financial experts to serve as his deputies. Ndegwa however informed Morse by cable gram that he would not be able to serve.

Business
Ndegwa was one of the top 10 shareholders of NIC Bank Group. He was the Chairman of the Mombasa Continental Resort.

Memoirs
Ndegwa released his memoirs Walking in Kenyatta Struggles: My Story in December 2006.

Awards
 Elder of the Order of the Golden Heart of Kenya (EGH) Presidential Award

Secretary

References

External links
 Mombasa Continental Resort
 NIC Bank

1925 births
Living people
People from Nyeri County
Governors of the Central Bank of Kenya
Kenyan expatriates in the United Kingdom
Makerere University alumni
Kenyan expatriates in Uganda